Ctenophorus clayi, also known commonly as the black-collared dragon, the black-shouldered ground-dragon, and Clay's dragon, is a species of lizard in the family Agamidae. The species is endemic to Australia.

Etymology
The specific name, clayi, is in honor of Australian herpetologist Brian T. Clay (1950–2004).

Geographic range and habitat
C. clayi occurs in red sand-ridges with spinifex in the central and western deserts of Australia, with an isolated population existing in North West Cape in Western Australia.

Reproduction
C. clayi is oviparous.

References

Further reading
Storr GM (1967). "The Amphibolurus reticulatus species-group (Lacertilia: Agamidae) in Western Australia". Journal of the Royal Society of Western Australia 49: 17–25. (Amphibolurus clayi, new species, p. 24).

Agamid lizards of Australia
clayi
Endemic fauna of Australia
Reptiles described in 1967
Taxa named by Glen Milton Storr